Rhaebo haematiticus (formerly Bufo haematiticus) is a species of toad in the family Bufonidae. It is found in eastern Honduras, Nicaragua, Costa Rica, Panama, Colombia, northwestern Venezuela (Serranía del Perijá), and northwestern Ecuador. Its altitudinal range is from sea level to  asl. Its natural habitats are primary tropical moist forest and submontane humid forest. It is a nocturnal, leaf-litter species that during the breeding seasons is found along small streams and large rivers. It tolerates some habitat degradation but only occurs close to forest. Threats to it are habitat loss caused by agriculture, wood extraction, and cattle ranching, and locally oil pollution and dams.

References

haematiticus
Amphibians of the Andes
Amphibians of Colombia
Amphibians of Costa Rica
Amphibians of Ecuador
Amphibians of Honduras
Amphibians of Nicaragua
Amphibians of Panama
Amphibians of Venezuela
Taxonomy articles created by Polbot
Amphibians described in 1862